Sky Wu (born 23 July 1966) is a Taiwanese Mandopop singer.

He began singing in 1986, and has won two Golden Melody Awards, best new artist in 1990, and best Mandarin male vocalist in 2004.

References

External links

1966 births
Musicians from New Taipei
Living people
Taiwanese Mandopop singer-songwriters
20th-century Taiwanese male  singers
21st-century Taiwanese  male singers